Sharbakty (Şarbaqty) is a selo in Pavlodar Region, Kazakhstan. It serves as the administrative center of Sharbakty District. Population:

References

Sharbakty at Astrolab.ru

Populated places in Pavlodar Region